Angela Christine Bridgland (born 1952) is an Australian teacher-librarian, library educator, academic, consultant and former board member and Fellow of Australian Library and Information Association. She is recognised for her contributions to higher education course development and staff development.

Career 
Bridgland taught at the Tasmanian and Melbourne Colleges of Advanced Education and University of Melbourne. She has been involved in senior management at University of Melbourne Libraries since 1994, including as Directory of the Library and University Librarian.

Bridgland served on the Victorian Branch Council of Australian Library and Information Association between 1982 and 1984, before becoming Branch president in 1985. She served on the Australian Library and Information Association Board of Education from 1989 until 1994.

In 1987 Bridgland was awarded a Fellowship at Library and Archives Canada, studying staff development. She has written widely on higher education staff development, including her Masters thesis on library instruction for teaching staff and her PhD thesis on Australian academic and state library staff.

References 

Australian librarians
Australian women librarians
1952 births
Living people
Academic staff of the University of Melbourne
University of Tasmania alumni
University of Melbourne alumni
University of Melbourne women